The South African Party was a political party that existed in the Union of South Africa from 1911 to 1934.

History
The outline and foundation for the party was realized after the election of a 'South African party' in the 1910 South African general election under the leadership of Louis Botha. It was made up predominantly of Afrikaner parties:
 Het Volk from the Transvaal
 Afrikaner Bond and South African Party from the Cape Colony
 Orangia Unie from the Orange River Colony

The South African Party of the Cape Colony was launched by William Schreiner, the former attorney-general under the leadership of Cecil Rhodes.  The party was intended to project a more moderate platform than that of the Afrikaner Bond.  This party also advocated more peaceful relations with neighboring states, especially the Transvaal.  Schreiner originally formed the party to oppose the "personal domination of Mr. Rhodes."  Eventually, the Afrikaner Bond would lend their support to form a new government.

Initially its main political opposition came from Unionist Party, which supported similar policies, but was more English-speaking and took an instinctively pro-British stance.

The SAP would solidify after the departure of Barry Hertzog and more radical Boer nationalists who formed the National Party.

Rising discontent with the economic policies of the SAP during the bad economic times of the early 1920s culminated in a general strike in 1922. Though a combination of military intervention and negotiation ended the strike, the memory of it remained when the government, now a SAP-Unionist coalition government under the leadership of Jan Smuts, faced the 1924 South African general election, in which it was defeated by a National-Labour coalition. The SAP remained in opposition with its Unionist allies until the unrest of the Great Depression forced Prime Minister Barry Hertzog of the Nationalists to form a coalition government and on 5 December 1934 a merger which created the United South African National Party (more commonly known as the United Party).

From the beginning, a hardliner nationalist faction refused to accept the merger. The remaining nationalists later withdrew from the United Party in 1939, after which what remained was essentially the old SAP under a new name. Nevertheless, the United Party name was retained.

Electoral history

House of Assembly elections

Note

References

Political parties established in 1911
Defunct political parties in South Africa
1911 establishments in South Africa
Political parties disestablished in 1934
Afrikaner organizations
Afrikaner nationalism
Conservative parties in South Africa
Liberal parties in South Africa
Protestant political parties